Project Nimbus is a cloud computing project of the Israeli government and its military. The Israeli Finance Ministry announced April 2021, that the contract is to provide "the government, the defense establishment, and others with an all-encompassing cloud solution." Under the contract, the companies will establish local cloud sites that will "keep information within Israel's borders under strict security guidelines."

Project Nimbus has four planned phases: the first is purchasing and constructing the cloud infrastructure, the second is crafting government policy for moving operations onto the cloud, the third is moving operations to the cloud, and the fourth is implementing and optimizing cloud operations. Under a $1.2 billion contract, technology companies Google (Google Cloud Platform) and Amazon (Amazon Web Services) were selected to provide Israeli government agencies with cloud computing services, including artificial intelligence and machine learning.

The terms Israel set for the project contractually forbid Amazon and Google from halting services due to boycott pressure. The tech companies are also forbidden from denying service to any particular government entities.

Criticism 
The contract has drawn rebuke and condemnation from the companies' shareholders as well as their employees, over concerns that the project will lead to further abuses of Palestinians' human rights in the context of the ongoing occupation and the Israeli–Palestinian conflict. Specifically, they voice concern over how the technology will enable further surveillance of Palestinians and unlawful data collection on them as well as facilitate the expansion of Israel's illegal settlements on Palestinian land.

Ariel Koren, who had worked as a marketing manager for Google’s educational products and was an outspoken opponent of the project, was given the ultimatum of moving to São Paulo within 17 days or losing her job. In a letter announcing her resignation to her colleagues, Koren wrote that Google "systematically silences Palestinian, Jewish, Arab and Muslim voices concerned about Google’s complicity in violations of Palestinian human rights—to the point of formally retaliating against workers and creating an environment of fear," reflecting her view that the ultimatum came in retaliation for her opposition to and organization against the project.

References 

Military projects
Amazon Web Services
Google
Criticism of Google
Surveillance databases
Human rights in the State of Palestine